Platysace commutata is a shrub that is endemic to Western Australia.

It blooms between October and April producing white-cream and blue flowers.

Often found among quartzite rocks on hill tops and summits it is distributed widely but with a scattered population from the Mid West down to the Great Southern region of Western Australia growing in sandy soils or granitic clays.

The plant was first described by the botanist Nikolai Turczaninow as Trachymene commutata in 1849 in the article Decas sexta generum plantarum hucusque, non descriptorum in the journal, Bulletin de la Société Impériale des Naturalistes de Moscou and later moved into the Platysace genera by C. Norman in 1939.

References

commutata
Flora of Western Australia
Plants described in 1849